The Turkmen Brigades are Iraqi Turkmen militias formed as part of the Popular Mobilization Forces in 2014.

The group's commander, Said Yilmaz Najar, rejected proposals for a unified Turkmen militia from the Iraqi Turkmen Front, saying that his group has both Shia and Sunni Turkmen.

On 25 September 2016, 16th Brigade announced that the militias would participate in the Hawija Offensive.

References

Iraqi Turkmen organizations
Anti-ISIL factions in Iraq
Paramilitary forces of Iraq
Popular Mobilization Forces
Rebel groups in Iraq
Resistance movements